Davis Ansah Opoku (born 13 September 1984) is a Ghanaian politician, a member of Parliament for Mpraeso Constituency in the Eastern Region of Ghana. He serves as the Deputy Ranking Member of the Public Accounts Committee and a member of the works & Housing Committee of Parliament In October 2021, the 40 under 40 awards ceremony adjudged Davis as a young leader in Governance and Government agencies.

Early life 
Opuku was born in Accra, 13 September 1984 to Sampson Opoku of Kwahu Asakraka and Helena Opoku of Obomeng Kwahu.

Education 
Opuku attended Nkwatia Secondary School in Ghana and graduated from the University of Cape Coast with a degree in laboratory technology. He continued to the University of London to study Law and then to University of Leicester where he completed his course in communication. He holds a certificate in strategic political communication from the International Academy for Leadership (IAF), Germany and currently in the final stage of his Legal Practice Course and Masters in Law at the University of Law.

Career 

Opuku has a decade of experience working with agencies, corporations, non-profits, and start-ups as a public relations consultant and public interest advocate. He formed Siri Communications Limited in 2016. He served as deputy director and Executive Assistant to the Chief Executive of The National Health Insurance Authority (NHIA).

Politics 
Opoku served as director of communications, then later as director of operations for the Alliance for Accountable Governance (AFAG). The role of the group was to expose some alleged rots during the NDC term in office.

During the 2008 elections, Opoku served as the President of the Tertiary Students Confederacy (TESCON), the New Patriotic Party's intelligential wing (NPP)

Opoku is a leading member of the pressure group, Let My Vote Count Movement (LMVC), which seeks electoral reforms.

In 2019 he did his national service at the parliament and was part of the National Mock Parliament of the Ghana @ 50 celebrations and in 2021 became a full member of parliament for the Mpreaso Constituency.

He formed Kwahu Professionals Network which he is serving as the first president.

References 

New Patriotic Party politicians
Living people
Ghanaian MPs 2021–2025
Alumni of the University of Leicester
Ghanaian expatriates in the United Kingdom
Alumni of the University of London
University of Cape Coast alumni
1984 births
People from Accra